Boyi may refer to the following people:

Boyi (legendary leader), also known as Boyi 伯益,  culture hero in Chinese mythology
Boyi (Jiang), founder of the Lü state (see :zh:伯夷 (姜姓))
Boyi (prince) (伯夷), ancient Chinese prince (brother of Shuqi)
Guo Jia (170–207), courtesy name Boyi (伯益), adviser to the warlord Cao Cao
Boyi Bhimanna (బోయి భీమన్న,  1911–2005), Telugu language poet
Feng Boyi (馮博一, born 1960), Chinese art critic